The Committees of the 2nd Supreme People's Assembly (SPA) was elected by the 1st Session of the 2nd Supreme People's Assembly on 20 September 1957. It was replaced on 23 October 1962 by the committees of the 3rd Supreme People's Assembly.

Committees

Bills

Budget

Credentials

Foreign Affairs

References

Citations

Bibliography
Books:
 

2nd Supreme People's Assembly
1957 establishments in North Korea
1962 disestablishments in North Korea